Schneeball may refer to:

Schneeball (record label)
Schneeball (pastry)